The Huronian Supergroup is a Proterozoic assemblage of geologic formations of the Superior craton of the Canadian Shield in Ontario and Quebec. It extends from west of the city of Sault Ste. Marie in the west to the Ontario-Quebec border to the east and is part of the Southern Geologic Province.

Stratigraphy

The Huronian Supergroup consists of four groups.  All the rocks are low grade metamorphic sedimentary rocks or igneous rocks.  

The four geologic groups that make up the Huronian are the Elliot Lake Group, Hough Lake Group, Quirke Lake Group, and the Cobalt Group (from oldest to youngest).  Major glacial periods, Huronian glaciation, occurred at the beginning of the Hough Lake, Quirke Lake and Cobalt.

Age

The bulk of the Huronian Group consists of mostly metamorphosed sandstones and mudstones.  Since there are no index fossils, the sedimentary rocks cannot be dated using fossils, like they can in Phanerozoic rocks.  However, the base contains volcanics that have been dated at about 2.480 billion years ago (Gya).  The top of the Huronian and cross cutting all of the units within are the Nipissing sills which date to 2.2185 Gya.  The age at which the Huronian sediments were deposited is between 2.480 Gya and 2.219 Gya.

See also
 Jasper conglomerate

References

Geology of Ontario
Geology of Quebec